Events in the year 997 in Norway.

Incumbents
 Monarch – Olaf Tryggvason.

Events
The city of Nidaros is founded.

Arts and literature

Births

Deaths

References

Norway